Pavoclinus myae, or Mya's klipfish, is a species of clinid fish found from East London to Algoa Bay along the coast of South Africa. The specific name honors the primary author's then fiancée, Mya van Harten.

Description
Mya's klipfish is rusty brown with a number of vertical maroon bars along its body and a silver spot behind each one of its eyes. There are several smaller spots on the preopercule and abdomen, and reddish bar near the eye radiate downward near the ventre.

Distribution and Habitat
Individuals can grow to a maximum length of  TL. This species feeds primarily on aquatic arthropods such as amphipods, isopods and tanaids.

Mya's kilpfish is only known from the southeastern portion of the Atlantic Ocean, especially from the coastal waters of South Africa, from East London, north to Algoa Bay.

References

External links
 Drawing

myae
Fish described in 1978